Calcaxonia is a suborder of soft corals in the order Alcyonacea.

References 

 Taxonomic Study of Suborder Calcaxonia (Alcyonacea: Octocorallia: Anthozoa) from King Sejong Station, Antarctic. Song Jun-Im, Hwang Sung-Jin, Moon Haewon and An In-Young, Animal Systematics, 30 Apr 2012, Evolution and Diversity Volume 28, Issue2, pages 84~96,

External links 

 
 

 
Alcyonacea
Cnidarian suborders